Žvarulje ( or , in older sources also Žvarovlje or Žvarule) is a settlement west of Izlake in the Municipality of Zagorje ob Savi in central Slovenia. The area is part of the traditional region of Upper Carniola. It is now included with the rest of the municipality in the Central Sava Statistical Region.

Geography

Žvarulje includes the hamlets of Hmeljno to the northwest of the village center and Zlokarje to the southeast, along the road to Dolgo Brdo pri Mlinšah.

History
The hamlet of Zlokarje had a population of 17 in 1931, and a population of 12 (in two houses) in 1953.

Church
The local church is dedicated to Saint Gregory and belongs to the Parish of Kolovrat. It dates to the 18th century.

References

External links

Žvarulje on Geopedia

Populated places in the Municipality of Zagorje ob Savi